The NP300E5A-A01UB is a laptop computer produced by Samsung.  Its standard operating system is a 64-bit version of Windows 7, its central processing unit is an Intel Core i3-2330M Processor with a processing speed of 2.20 gigahertz.  It comes with 4 gigabytes of DDR3 SDRAM, expandable up to 8. It has a display size of 15.6 inches with a 1366 x 768 resolution.
  The graphics chipset is an Intel HD Graphics 3000, has a built-in 1.3MP HD webcam, a wireless LAN of 802.11 a/b/g/n, is Bluetooth 3.0 compatible, and has VGA, HDMI, and three USB ports. It has a built-in track point mouse.

References

Samsung computers